The Battle of Salamanca took place between 9 and 10 March 1858, in Salamanca (near Guanajuato, Mexico), during Mexico's War of Reform (1858-60). Elements of the liberal army, under General Anastasio Parrodi, governor of the Jalisco, fought with Generals Leandro Valle, Santos Degollado, and Mariano Moret, against conservatives commanded by General Luis G. Osollo. Osollo's army had some 5,000 men, including Generals Miguel Miramón and Tomás Mejía, Francisco García Casanova. The conservatives won, handing the liberals a second liberal defeat, forcing them to retreat to Guadalajara from Guanajuato.

This battle was also known as the Battle of War Coalition (Spanish: Arroyo Feo), since at that time the fighting between liberals and conservatives were limited to Guanajuato, Jalisco, Zacatecas, San Luis Potosí, Michoacan, and Aguascalientes. These states formed a coalition to oppose the Plan of Tacubaya, gathering 7,000 men and 30 pieces of artillery, the same who had fought in Celaya.  Parrodi blamed the liberal loss on General Mariano Moret for not ordering the cavalry charge, and Manuel Doubled for inactivity in battle.

References

History of Guanajuato
1858 in Mexico
Conflicts in 1858
March 1858 events
Reform War